Igor Pokaz (born 23 May 1968) is a Croatian diplomat that has served as ambassador to NATO and Russia. He is serving as Croatia's ambassador to the United Kingdom since September 1, 2017.

Education 
Pokaz has a Bachelor of Economics degree from the University of Zagreb and received his Master's degree in International Relations from the Global Master of Arts Program at The Fletcher School, Tufts University. He also attended Oxford University's Foreign Service Programme from 1998 to 1999.

Career 

Igor Pokaz started working in the Ministry of Foreign Affairs in 1994. His first posting abroad was to the Permanent Mission of the Republic of Croatia to the United Nations from 1999 to 2003, in the capacity of diplomatic counsellor. From 2003 to 2007, Pokaz served in the Ministry of Defence, as the Head of Department for International Defense Cooperation and followingly as Under Secretary for Defense Policy. He briefly worked in the private sector, as Head of the Office of CEO Emil Tedeschi at Atlantic Grupa from 2007 to 2008. Pokaz returned to the public sector at the calling of then Prime Minister Ivo Sanader and President Stjepan Mesić, as he was appointed Permanent Representative to NATO. The rationale behind the appointment was the key role Pokaz played in Croatia's accession to NATO, as well as his expertise on defense policy gained during his service at the Ministry of Defence. Pokaz went on to serve as Croatia's ambassador to the Russian Federation from 2012 to 2015, and is currently serving as the Ambassador of the Republic of Croatia to the United Kingdom - a position he was posted to in 2017.

Personal life 
Igor Pokaz is the son of retired Croatian general Ivan Pokaz. He is married and has one child.

Pokaz served in the Croatian Armed Forces during the Croatian War of Independence from 1991 to 1995. 
In 1992, he was promoted to the rank of Lieutenant in the Croatian Armed Forces

References

1968 births
Living people
Croatian diplomats
Permanent Representatives of Croatia to NATO
Ambassadors of Croatia to Russia
Chevening Scholars